Problepsis vulgaris is a moth of the family Geometridae. It is found in Asia, including India and Thailand.

References

Moths described in 1889
Scopulini
Moths of Asia